Manuel de Sousa Coutinho (1540–1591) was the 14th Captain-major of Portuguese Ceylon. Coutinho was appointed in 1578 under Sebastian of Portugal, he was Captain-major until 1583. He was succeeded by João de Correia de Brito.

References

Captain-majors of Ceilão
16th-century Portuguese people
1540 births
1591 deaths